Vicuña Airport  or El Indio Airport,  is an extremely high elevation airstrip  east-northeast of Vicuña, Coquimbo, Chile.

The airstrip serves several small settlements, and is subject to snow cover. It is within a small fold above a steep mountain valley high in the Andes, and runs uphill to the north. There is mountainous terrain in all quadrants, with a best escape route to the south down the valley.

See also

Transport in Chile
List of airports in Chile

References

External links
OpenStreetMap - El Indio Airport
OurAirports - El Indio Airport
FallingRain - El Indio Airport

Airports in Chile
Airports in Coquimbo Region